A.O. Giouchtas F.C., short for Athlitikos Omilos Archanes “Giouchtas” (translated Athletic Club of Archanes “Giouchtas”) and also known simply as Giouchtas, is a Greek football club, based in Archanes, Heraklion. The club is named after Mount Juktas, overlooking the town of Archanes. The club was founded in 1957 and its traditional colors are green and white. They currently compete in the Gamma Ethniki, the third tier of the Greek football league system, and host their home games in the Archanes National Stadium, known also as “Markomichelakio Stadium”.  They have previously played for two seasons in the Gamma Ethniki during 2013-15.

History
Giouchtas was established on July 25, 1957 as a means to spread sports in the Archanes region. The club eventually gained its own football ground after a local doctor, Michalis Markomichelakis donated 8,119 square meters of land for a stadium to be built. The venue was completed in 1962, and was named “Markomichelakio”, in honor of this generous donation.

Giouchtas have enjoyed relative success in regional competitions, having won the Heraklion FCA Cup on two consecutive occasions in 2009 and 2010. In 2007, Giouchtas managed a promotion to the Delta Ethniki, the fourth tier of the Greek football league system. They played in the fourth Division until 2013, when they earned promotion to the Gamma Ethniki for the first time in club history. They played two season in the third Division before being relegated in 2015.

In 2018, Giouchtas won their first Heraklion FCA Championship, managing a return to the Gamma Ethniki after a three-year absence.

Honours

Regional
 Heraklion FCA Championship
Winners (1): 2017−18
 Heraklion FCA Cup
Winners (2): 2008−09, 2009−10

Players

Current squad

References

External links
 

Football clubs in Heraklion
Football clubs in Crete
Association football clubs established in 1957
1957 establishments in Greece
Gamma Ethniki clubs